The 2014 Sydney to Hobart Yacht Race, sponsored by Rolex and hosted by the Cruising Yacht Club of Australia in Sydney, New South Wales, was the 70th annual running of the "blue water classic" Sydney to Hobart Yacht Race. The 2014 edition began on Sydney Harbour at 1pm on Boxing Day (26 December 2014), before heading south for  through the Tasman Sea, past Bass Strait, into Storm Bay and up the River Derwent, to cross the finish line in Hobart, Tasmania.

Line honours were claimed by Wild Oats XI in a time of 2 days, 2 hours, 3 minutes and 26 seconds. It was the yacht's eighth win, breaking the record for most line honours victories. The previous record had been set by Morna (now Kurrewa IV) with 7 victories in 1960. Wild Rose (Roger Hickman) was awarded the Tattersall's Cup.

117 boats started the race and 103 finished.

Results

Line honours (first 10)

Handicap results (Top 10)

References

Sydney to Hobart Yacht Race
Sydney
Sydney
December 2014 sports events in Australia